FC Kalush was a Ukrainian professional football club from Kalush, Ivano-Frankivsk Oblast.

History

The club was founded soon after World War II as Khimik Kalush and in the Soviet competitions competed at regional level and KFK (amateur level). The club was reestablished in place of previously existed Polish club at the chemical plant TESP that also was overtaken by Soviets. Khimik Kalush also was associated with the Soviet chemical and metallurgical association "Khlorvinil" that was expanded in 1961.

At KFK level the club competed until 1995, when as Khimik entered the Druha Liha. Its main sponsor "Khlorvinil" was reorganized as a state enterprise "Oriana". Later in 1995, Khimik renamed themselves to FC Kalush.

The club struggled at this level of competition. In 2001, "Oriana" and the Russian oil conglomerate Lukoil created a joint venture "Lukor". In 2001 the club also renamed themselves to FC LUKOR Kalush and the new sponsorship immediately improved the status of the club. In 2002 Lukor already announced about its financial instability and filed for bankruptcy. In the next season the club won the Druha Liha 2002–03 Group A championship. However, at the end of the season the club was bought out by neighboring club FC Prykarpattya Ivano-Frankivsk and they were subsequently renamed and made into a reserve club.

The club renamed again to FC Spartak-2 Ivano-Frankivsk in 2004 and later in that year they were dissolved.

The club reformed in 2006 and played at the Amateur level.

On 17 January 2014, Lukor Kalush filed for bankruptcy and its liquidation.

After a break of over 10 years the club was readmitted to the Professional Football League of Ukraine for the 2018–19 Ukrainian Second League competition.

Emblems

Honors
Ukrainian Druha Liha
Winners (1): 2002/03 Group A (as LUKOR Kalush)
Ukrainian Football Amateur League
Winners (1): 1994-95 Group 1
Finalists (1): 1992-93 Group 1
 Ukrainian Amateur Cup
Finalists (1): 1972
 Ivano-Frankivsk Oblast Football Federation championship
Winners (13): 1947, 1952, 1955, 1957, 1958, 1959, 1960, 1961, 1966, 1967, 1969, 1975, 1978, 1995
Finalists (9): 1949
 Ivano-Frankivsk Oblast Football Federation Cup
Winners (14):

League and cup history

{|class="wikitable"
|-bgcolor="#efefef"
! Season
! Div.
! Pos.
! Pl.
! W
! D
! L
! GS
! GA
! P
!Domestic Cup
!colspan=2|Europe
!Notes
|-bgcolor=SteelBlue
|align=center|1987
|align=center|4th
|align=center bgcolor=tan|3
|align=center|14
|align=center|7
|align=center|2
|align=center|5
|align=center|17
|align=center|11
|align=center|16
|align=center|
|align=center|
|align=center|
|align=center|as Kolos Kalush
|-bgcolor=SteelBlue
|align=center|1988
|align=center|4th
|align=center|5
|align=center|18
|align=center|7
|align=center|5
|align=center|6
|align=center|14
|align=center|11
|align=center|19
|align=center|
|align=center|
|align=center|
|align=center|as Kolos Kalush
|-bgcolor=SteelBlue
|align=center|1990
|align=center|4th
|align=center|6
|align=center|28
|align=center|11
|align=center|8
|align=center|9
|align=center|39
|align=center|26
|align=center|30
|align=center|
|align=center|
|align=center|
|align=center|as Halychyna Kalush
|-bgcolor=SteelBlue
|align=center|1991
|align=center|4th
|align=center|
|align=center|
|align=center|
|align=center|
|align=center|
|align=center|
|align=center|
|align=center|
|align=center|
|align=center|
|align=center|
|align=center|
|-bgcolor=SteelBlue
|align=center|1992–93
|align=center|4th
|align=center bgcolor=silver|2
|align=center|24
|align=center|15
|align=center|3
|align=center|6
|align=center|50
|align=center|30
|align=center|33
|align=center|
|align=center|
|align=center|
|align=center|as Khimik Kalush
|-bgcolor=SteelBlue
|align=center|1993–94
|align=center|4th
|align=center|6
|align=center|26
|align=center|11
|align=center|4
|align=center|11
|align=center|34
|align=center|32
|align=center|26
|align=center|
|align=center|
|align=center|
|align=center|
|-bgcolor=SteelBlue
|align=center|1994–95
|align=center|4th
|align=center bgcolor=gold|1
|align=center|26
|align=center|16
|align=center|6
|align=center|2
|align=center|37
|align=center|12
|align=center|48
|align=center|
|align=center|
|align=center|
|align=center|
|-bgcolor=PowderBlue
|align=center|1995–96
|align=center|3rd "A"
|align=center|5
|align=center|40
|align=center|22
|align=center|8
|align=center|10
|align=center|64
|align=center|31
|align=center|74
|align=center| finals
|align=center|
|align=center|
|align=center|Renamed
|-bgcolor=PowderBlue
|align=center|1996–97
|align=center|3rd "A"
|align=center|11
|align=center|30
|align=center|9
|align=center|8
|align=center|13
|align=center|32
|align=center|29
|align=center|35
|align=center| finals
|align=center|
|align=center|
|align=center|
|-bgcolor=PowderBlue
|align=center|1997–98
|align=center|3rd "A"
|align=center|15
|align=center|34
|align=center|11
|align=center|5
|align=center|18
|align=center|32
|align=center|42
|align=center|38
|align=center| finals
|align=center|
|align=center|
|align=center|
|-bgcolor=PowderBlue
|align=center|1998–99
|align=center|3rd "A"
|align=center|12
|align=center|28
|align=center|6
|align=center|8
|align=center|14
|align=center|20
|align=center|45
|align=center|26
|align=center|Did not enter
|align=center|
|align=center|
|align=center|
|-bgcolor=PowderBlue
|align=center|1999-00
|align=center|3rd "A"
|align=center|15
|align=center|30
|align=center|6
|align=center|6
|align=center|18
|align=center|19
|align=center|51
|align=center|24
|align=center| finals Second League Cup
|align=center|
|align=center|
|align=center|
|-bgcolor=PowderBlue
|align=center|2000–01
|align=center|3rd "A"
|align=center|15
|align=center|30
|align=center|7
|align=center|2
|align=center|21
|align=center|26
|align=center|74
|align=center|23
|align=center| finals Second League Cup
|align=center|
|align=center|
|align=center|
|-bgcolor=PowderBlue
|align=center|2001–02
|align=center|3rd "A"
|align=center|5
|align=center|36
|align=center|19
|align=center|8
|align=center|9
|align=center|63
|align=center|35
|align=center|65
|align=center|1st Round
|align=center|
|align=center|
|align=center|Renamed
|-bgcolor=PowderBlue
|align=center|2002–03
|align=center|3rd "A"
|align=center bgcolor=gold|1
|align=center|28
|align=center|21
|align=center|2
|align=center|5
|align=center|56
|align=center|25
|align=center|65
|align=center| finals
|align=center|
|align=center|
|align=center|Club taken over
|-bgcolor=PowderBlue
|align=center|2003–04
|align=center|3rd "A"
|align=center|8
|align=center|30
|align=center|11
|align=center|4
|align=center|15
|align=center|29
|align=center|31
|align=center|37
|align=center|
|align=center|
|align=center|
|align=center|Reserve club— Renamed
|-bgcolor=PowderBlue
|align=center|2004–05
|align=center|3rd "A"
|align=center|13
|align=center|28
|align=center|6
|align=center|2
|align=center|20
|align=center|17
|align=center|12
|align=center|20
|align=center|
|align=center|
|align=center|
|align=center|Club folds
|-
|align=center|2006–16
|align=center colspan=13|Club reforms as FC Kalush
|-bgcolor=SteelBlue
|align=center|2017–18
|align=center|4th "1"
|align=center|5
|align=center|16 	
|align=center|7 	
|align=center|3 	
|align=center|6 	
|align=center|16	
|align=center|14 	
|align=center|24
|align=center| finals 
|align=center|
|align=center|
|align=center bgcolor=lightgreen|Applied
|-bgcolor=PowderBlue
|align=center|2018–19
|align=center|3rd "A"
|align=center|7/10
|align=center|27
|align=center|10
|align=center|6
|align=center|11
|align=center|30
|align=center|33
|align=center|36
|align=center| finals
|align=center|
|align=center|
|align=center|
|-bgcolor=PowderBlue
| align="center" |2019–20
| align="center" |3rd "A"
| align="center" |5/11
| align="center" |20
| align="center" |8
| align="center" |5
| align="center" |7
| align="center" |26
| align="center" |20
| align="center" |29
| align="center" | finals
| align="center" |
| align="center" |
| align="center" |
|}

Notable players
  Yozhef Sabo

Coaches
 1997 Ivan Krasnetskyi
 2000 Volodymyr Holovatyi
 2001 Volodymyr Mandryk
 2001–2002 Mykola Prystay
 2002 Ihor Yurchenko
 2003 Mykola Prystay
 2016–2017 Petro Lesiv
 2017 Stepan Matviyiv
 2017–2018 Vasyl Malyk
 2019–2020 Andriy Nesteruk
 2019 Vasyl Kachur
 2019– Stepan Matviyiv

See also
 TESP (company)

Notes

References

External links
 Official website
 FC Kalush at AAFU

 
Defunct football clubs in Ukraine
Football clubs in Kalush, Ukraine
FC Spartak Ivano-Frankivsk
Lukoil
Association football clubs established in 1947
Association football clubs disestablished in 2020
1947 establishments in Ukraine
2020 disestablishments in Ukraine